{{DISPLAYTITLE:Eta1 Pictoris}}

η1 Pictoris, Latinised as Eta1 Pictoris, is a solitary star in the southern constellation of Pictor. It is faintly visible to the naked eye with an apparent visual magnitude of +5.37. Based upon an annual parallax shift of 38.35 mas as seen from the Earth, the system is located 85 light years from the Sun.

This is an F-type main sequence star with a stellar classification of F5 V and it is chromospherically active. It is an estimated 2.15 billion years old and is spinning with a projected rotational velocity of 22.7 km/s. The star has 1.4 times the mass of the Sun and about 1.1 times the Sun's radius. It is radiating 3.7 times the Sun's luminosity from its photosphere at an effective temperature of roughly 6,631 K.

References

F-type main-sequence stars
Pictor (constellation)
Pictoris, Eta1
Durchmusterung objects
032743
023482
1649
0187